Li Ying (born 7 January 1993) is a Chinese footballer who currently plays for Shandong Sports Lottery in the Chinese Women's Super League.

On June 22, 2021, she announced on Chinese microblogging platform Sina Weibo her engagement to girlfriend Chen Leilei. This made Li the first Chinese sports player to officially come out as a lesbian. Her Weibo post went viral before it was deleted, with some speculating that Li might have been put under pressure from authorities following the announcement.

International goals

Honours
Individual
 IFFHS AFC Woman Team of the Decade 2011–2020

See also
 List of women's footballers with 100 or more caps

References

External links
 
 

1993 births
Living people
Lesbian sportswomen
LGBT association football players
People's Republic of China LGBT people
Chinese LGBT sportspeople
Chinese lesbians
Chinese women's footballers
China women's international footballers
2015 FIFA Women's World Cup players
Footballers at the 2016 Summer Olympics
Footballers from Chongqing
Women's association football forwards
Footballers at the 2014 Asian Games
Olympic footballers of China
Footballers at the 2018 Asian Games
Asian Games silver medalists for China
Asian Games medalists in football
Medalists at the 2018 Asian Games
Chinese expatriate sportspeople in South Korea
2019 FIFA Women's World Cup players
FIFA Century Club